Tasmaphena lamproides is a species of land snail in the family Rhytididae. It occurs in north-western Tasmania and probably far southern Victoria. It is known by the common name keeled snail.

There are many small subpopulations, and the total population in Tasmania is probably a few hundred thousand snails. The snail generally lives in wet forest habitat. Some subpopulations are threatened by logging and clearing of forests for development and agriculture.

References

Rhytididae
Gastropods of Australia
Endemic fauna of Tasmania
Invertebrates of Tasmania
Gastropods described in 1868
Taxonomy articles created by Polbot